Watling is a surname. Notable people with the surname include:

 Alan Watling (born 1948), Australian rules footballer
 Barry Watling (born 1946), English footballer
 BJ Watling (born 1985), New Zealand-South African cricketer
 Bradley-John Watling (born 1985), New Zealand cricketer
 Deborah Watling (1948–2017), English actress
 Dick Watling (born 1951), Fijian ornithologist
 Dilys Watling (1943–2021), English actress
 E. F. Watling (1899–1990), English classicist and translator
 Geoffrey Watling (1913–2004), English president
 Giles Watling (born 1953), English actor and politician
 Jack Watling (1923–2001), English actor
 John Watling (died 1681), 17th-century British buccaneer
 John Leonard Watling (1923–2004), British philosopher
 Jonathan Watling (born 1976), American rower
 Josser Watling (born 1925), English footballer
 Leonor Watling (born 1975), Spanish actress
 Ralph Watling (1872–1951), English badminton player
 Roy Watling (born 1934), Scottish mycologist

See also
 Watling Estate, the LCC housing estate in Edgware, London
 Watling Island, name for San Salvador Island 1680–1925
 Watling Street, Roman road in England

English-language surnames